Åsa Persson (born 17 October 1983 in Osby) is a Swedish former competitive figure skater. She is the 2003 Swedish national champion and 1998 & 1999 junior national champion. She competed in the free skate at four ISU Championships – 2000 Junior Worlds in Oberstdorf, Germany; 2002 Junior Worlds in Hamar, Norway; 2002 Worlds in Nagano, Japan; and 2003 Europeans in Malmö, Sweden. Her highest placement, 14th, came at 2002 Junior Worlds. She was coached by Jan Ullmark.

After retiring from competition, Persson became the Ice Captain on board the Royal Caribbean cruise ship Allure of the Seas.

Programs

Results

References

External links
 
 Figure skating corner profile

1983 births
Living people
People from Osby Municipality
Swedish female single skaters
Sportspeople from Skåne County
21st-century Swedish women